Elysian Heights is a neighborhood in Los Angeles, California.

Geography 
Elysian Heights is bounded by the hills just north of Sunset Boulevard on the south, Glendale Boulevard on the west,  Elysian Park on the east, and the 5 Freeway on the north.

History

Elysian Heights started out as a summer getaway. The neighborhood has been home to many of the counter-culture, political radicals, artists, writers, architects and filmmakers in Los Angeles. The children of many progressives attended school there during the 1930s, '40s and '50s. By the '30s, it was known as Red Hill, for the communists thought to live there.

In 2005, The Los Angeles chapter of the Sierra Club sponsored the "Elysian Heights Stairway Walk".

Education

 Elysian Heights Elementary School - 1562 Baxter Avenue

Historic-Cultural Monuments

The following Historic-Cultural Monuments are located in Eylsian Heights:

 Ross House − 2123 N. Valentine Street. On September 23, 2009 it became Historic-Cultural Monument #964

Notable buildings

 Southhall house, designed by Rudolph Schindler
 Philip Dike house
 Harwell Hamilton house
 Paul Landacre house
 Estelle Lawton Lindsey house
 Carey McWilliams house
 Klock House
 Atwater bungalows - Adobe bungalows designed by Robert Stacy-Judd

Notable residents

Elysian Heights was home to "Room 8 the Cat".

See also
The following books list hikes in the Elysian Heights neighborhood:
 Urban Hikes in Southern California 
 Walking Los Angeles: 38 of the City’s Most Vibrant Historic, Revitalized, and Up-and-Coming Neighborhoods 

At one time the home of Clara Kimball Young was an estate from Cerro Gordo St To Curran St on Valentine  St. Young was a famous silent film star from approximately 1918 to 1930.

References

Neighborhoods in Los Angeles
Northwest Los Angeles